Martin Scicluna (born 28 November 1960 in Malta) was a professional footballer, during his career he played for Rabat Ajax and Żurrieq, where he played as a defender.

International career

Malta
Scicluna played for the Malta national football team in the UEFA Euro 1988 qualifying rounds.

Coaching career
On 3 June 2011, Martin Scicluna was named as the new under 19 coach for Valletta, replacing the outgoing Twanny Dalli.

References

Living people
1960 births
Maltese footballers
Malta international footballers
Vittoriosa Stars F.C. players
Rabat Ajax F.C. players
Żurrieq F.C. players
Hibernians F.C. players
Victoria Hotspurs F.C. players
Association football defenders